Sergio Montero Ortiz (born 17 March 1997) is a Spanish footballer who plays for AE Prat as an attacking midfielder.

Club career
Born in Ripollet, Barcelona, Catalonia, Montero joined CE Sabadell FC's youth setup at the age of 13. He made his senior debut with the reserves during the 2015–16 campaign in the Tercera División, and he renewed his contract for two further years on 21 July 2016.

Montero made his first-team debut on 13 May 2018, playing the last 28 minutes in a 0–0 Segunda División B home draw against Lleida Esportiu. On 6 July, he joined Gimnàstic de Tarragona and was assigned to the farm team in the fourth division.

Montero made his professional debut on 9 June 2019, starting in a 1–1 home draw against CD Lugo in the Segunda División, as his side was already relegated. A year later, he signed for third division side AE Prat.

References

External links

1997 births
Living people
People from Vallès Occidental
Sportspeople from the Province of Barcelona
Spanish footballers
Footballers from Catalonia
Association football midfielders
Segunda División players
Segunda División B players
Tercera División players
CE Sabadell FC B players
CE Sabadell FC footballers
CF Pobla de Mafumet footballers
Gimnàstic de Tarragona footballers
AE Prat players